Gary Joseph Winton (born ) is an American former basketball player best known for his collegiate career at the United States Military Academy ("Army") between 1974 and 1978. A 6'5" forward from Somerville, Alabama, Winton scored a then-school record 2,296 points (later surpassed by Kevin Houston) and grabbed a still-standing school record 1,168 rebounds. On 14 occasions he scored 30 or more points and recorded 15+ rebounds 17 times. In his junior and senior seasons Winton was an Honorable Mention All-American while playing for Naismith Memorial Basketball Hall of Fame coach Mike Krzyzewski.

The National Basketball Association's Cleveland Cavaliers selected him in the 1978 NBA Draft, but due to a five-year commitment to serve in the United States Army after graduation, he never played in the league. After graduation, he did play on the pre-Olympic traveling USA Basketball Team. In 1979, the men's basketball team participated in the Soviet Union's Spartakiad, an international sports event that the Soviet Union attempted to use to both oppose and supplement the Olympics. Winton ultimately never made the official Olympic roster, however.

In 1990, he served as Army's head softball coach for just that one season. Fifteen years later he was inducted in the Army Sports Hall of Fame as part of their 14-person induction class in 2005.

See also
 List of NCAA Division I men's basketball players with 2000 points and 1000 rebounds

References

1950s births
Living people
American men's basketball players
American softball coaches
Army Black Knights men's basketball players
Army Black Knights softball coaches
Basketball players from Alabama
Cleveland Cavaliers draft picks
Forwards (basketball)
People from Morgan County, Alabama
United States Army soldiers
Year of birth missing (living people)